San Shek Wan may refer to:
San Shek Wan, Lantau South (䃟石灣), a village in southern Lantau Island
San Shek Wan, Lantau North (䃟石灣), a place in northern Lantau Island
San Shek Wan South (散石灣南), a village in Tsing Shan Tsuen, Castle Peak
San Shek Wan North (散石灣北), a village in Tsing Shan Tsuen, Castle Peak